Gerald Nordland (1927–2019) was an American museum director and art critic.

Biography  
Nordland was dean of the Chouinard Art Institute (1960–64), then at the Washington Gallery of Modern Art (1964–1966), the San Francisco Museum of Art (1966–1973), and director of the Milwaukee Art Museum (1977–1985), and the UCLA New Wight Art Gallery (1973–1977). He co-founded Artforum magazine and authored over 60 publications.

Awards and honours 
	1985 Guggenheim Fellow – for Fine Arts Research

Publications 
Including co-authored books, and exhibition catalogues:
Gaston Lachaise, 1882–1935: sculpture and drawings (Los Angeles, 1964)
Gaston Lachaise, 1882–1935 (Ithaca, NY, 1974)
Ray Parker (Washington, 1966)
Gaston Lachaise: the man and his work (New York, 1974)
Fourteen abstract painters (Los Angeles, 1975)
Catalog of the UCLA collection of contemporary American photographs (Los Angeles, 1976)
Richard Diebenkorn Monotypes (Los Angeles, 1976)
Alberto Burri: a retrospective view, 1948–77 (Los Angeles, 1977)
Reuben Nakian: recent works (New York, 1982)
Ulfert Wilke, a retrospective (Salt Lake City, 1983)
Richard Diebenkorn (New York, 1987)
Ynes Johnson (1996)
Twentieth century American drawings from the Arkansas Arts Center Foundation collection (Little Rock, Ark, 1998)
Reuben Diebenkorn: revised and expanded (New York, 2001)
Jon Schueler: to the North (London, 2002)
Uncompromising Vision: The art of Jack Jefferson (2004)

References

External links 
 Loyola University Chicago. Archives & Special Collections. Gerald Nordland Papers, 1902-2013, Undated
 Oral history interview with Gerald Nordland, 2004 May 25-26

1927 births
2019 deaths
American art critics
Directors of museums in the United States
Directors of the Milwaukee Art Museum